Tahua is one of the cantons of the Tahua Municipality, the second municipal section of the Daniel Campos Province in the Potosí Department of Bolivia. During the census of 2001 it had 673 inhabitants. Its seat is Tahua with a population of 271 in 2001.

See also 
 Inkawasi Island
 Isla del Pescado
 Salar de Uyuni

References

External links
Tahua Municipality: population data and map

Cantons of Potosí Department
Cantons of Bolivia